Teariki Mateariki (born 12 May 1984) in the Cook Islands, is a footballer who played as a midfielder for Nikao Sokattack F.C. in the Cook Islands Round Cup and the Cook Islands national football team.

International career

International goals
Scores and results list the Cook Islands' goal tally first.

References

1984 births
Living people
Cook Islands international footballers
Association football midfielders
Cook Island footballers